Xenosaurus phalaroanthereon, the chin-spotted knob-scaled lizard, is a lizard found in Mexico.

References

Xenosauridae
Reptiles described in 2001
Reptiles of Mexico

Lizards of North America